Shepard Broad College of Law (also referred to as NSU Law and Nova Law) is the law school of Nova Southeastern University, located on the university's main campus in Davie, Florida. The school offers full-time day and part-time evening programs.

History 

Founded in 1974, the school is named after lawyer and philanthropist Shepard Broad, in recognition of his counsel, community leadership, and financial support. The law building is named after Leo Goodwin Sr., also an entrepreneur and philanthropist who was committed to the advancement of education and research. The school received approval by the American Bar Association in 1975.

Admissions, bar passage, employment statistics, ranking

Admissions: NSU Law admitted 45.7% of applications for the 2018 first year class. Of these, 32.9% matriculated. The school's median LSAT score is 150, while the median GPA is 3.11. 2017–2018 J.D. attrition for 1Ls was 15.1%.

Bar passage: Of the NSU Law graduates taking the Florida bar exam in July 2020, 67.4% passed, vs. a 71.7% overall average pass rate for that bar exam.

Post-graduation employment: According to NSU's 2018 ABA-required disclosures, 49.8% of the Class of 2018 obtained full-time, long-term, JD-required employment nine months after graduation.

Ranking:
In the 2023 rankings of law schools published by U.S. News & World Report, NSU was ranked in the bottom 25%: between #147 and #192 out of 192 law schools and between #53 and #69 of 69 law schools ranked in part-time law programs.

Costs 

The total cost of attendance (indicating the cost of tuition, fees, and living expenses) at NSU for the 2017–2018 academic year is $61,747.

Programs 

NSU Law offers the J.D. degree in the traditional three-year program, or in a four-year, part-time evening program for working professional students. International Dual-Degree programs are also available with Roma Tre University for Italy, Charles University in Prague for Czech Republic, and University of Barcelona for Spain. The program enables students to earn degrees in both common law and civil law, and can lead to licensure in multiple jurisdictions.

Extracurricular activities 

The Nova Law Review is the law school's flagship publication. It was established in 1976, and is published three times per year. The journal is managed by a student-directed honor society, consisting of board members from the third or fourth year law class, edited entirely by second, third year, and fourth students. It also publishes an online companion.
International Law Student's Association Journal of International and Comparative Law
Moot Court Society, the law school's moot court program
Jessup Moot Court Team, the law school's international law moot court team
NSU Trial Association, the law school's mock trial competition program

Facilities 

 Leo Goodwin Sr. Hall, which houses the College of Law, has two courtrooms which are used by students in the school's trial advocacy and moot court programs as well as by the National Institute for Trial Advocacy and state appellate court judges.
 The Panza Maurer Law Library houses the schools' collection on three floors in a 43,000 square foot facility. The first floor houses the library's state collection and various Florida journals and periodicals, as well as the microfiche room. The second floor contains the Circulation and Reference desks where visitors can find Study Guides, current periodicals and Reserved materials. The rest of the floor holds the Tax, Federal, Treaties, and General Collections, and librarian and administrative offices. The third floor has the library's Burris Collection, admiralty materials, offices of the Nova Law Review, the IT department, and is home to the library's Federal and United Nations selective Depository. The third floor is also home to the library's Technical Services department and the International Programs department. The Panza Maurer Law Library became a selective U.S. Federal depository in 1982 and collects approximately 15% of the publications that are available through the program, offering online access to the resources as well. The Library has also been a U.N. depository of English language materials since 1997, offering access to both print and electronic resources.

Notable alumni 
Ellyn Setnor Bogdanoff, former member of the Florida Senate
Carl J. Domino, former member of the Florida House of Representatives

References

External links 

Shepard Broad College of Law website
Nova Law Review website

Nova Southeastern University
ABA-accredited law schools in Florida
Educational institutions established in 1974